À propos de Nice is a 1930 silent short documentary film directed by Jean Vigo and photographed by Boris Kaufman. The film depicts life in Nice, France by documenting the people in the city, their daily routines, a carnival and social inequalities. Vigo described the film in an address to the Groupement des Spectateurs d'Avant-Garde: "In this film, by showing certain basic aspects of a city, a way of life is put on trial... the last gasps of a society so lost in its escapism that it sickens you and makes you sympathetic to a revolutionary solution."

À propos de Nice was Vigo's first film. It was followed by Taris, roi de l'eau (1931), Zéro de conduite (1933) and L'Atalante in 1934, the year Vigo died.

Background
Vigo, suffering from tuberculosis, worked as an assistant cameraman for a small company in Nice. After his father-in-law gave him and his wife $250, Vigo bought his own Debrie camera. In the summer of 1929 in Paris, Vigo met Boris and Mikhail Kaufman, the brothers of Dziga Vertov. Boris Kaufman was interested in Vigo's idea about making a film on the city of Nice, and the two, together with their wives, created a script. Vigo saved ends of film from his work and the filming was underway by year's end. In the film, Vigo wanted to avoid a travelogue approach and show the boredom of the upper class in the casinos and at the shore, and the struggle of the poor inhabitants in the slums. As Vigo and Kaufman were unable to shoot inside casinos, they decided to concentrate on the strength of their images and rely on the editing phase.

Plot
The film begins with aerial shots and soon shows closer footage of palm trees and waves crashing ashore. The camera concentrates on people; workers performing their daily chores and wealthy persons walking in the boulevards, sailing, playing games and relaxing at the Promenade des Anglais, as well as race car drivers competing in Grand Prix motor racing. After that, the film shows the poorer neighbourhood and poverty; women doing laundry and children playing their simple games in the streets. This is followed by a carnival; processions, masks and tourists dancing and celebrating. The film ends with images of statues and men working in a factory.

Music
The film premiered with a new score by Michael Nyman at the Barbican Theatre on 21 October 2005. The score was regarded as thematically fitting but not successful at capturing the film's humor.

See also
 O Dreamland – a 1953 short made by Lindsay Anderson, an admirer of Vigo.

References

Bibliography

External links
 
 
 
 
  
 

1930 films
1930 documentary films
Films directed by Jean Vigo
French short documentary films
French silent short films
1930s short documentary films
Films set in France
Films shot in Nice
Black-and-white documentary films
Films set in Nice
French black-and-white films
1930 directorial debut films
1930s French films